The voiceless bilabial nasal is a type of consonantal sound, used in some spoken languages. The symbol in the International Phonetic Alphabet that represents this sound is ⟨⟩, a combination of the letter for the voiced bilabial nasal and a diacritic indicating voicelessness. The equivalent X-SAMPA symbol is m_0.

Features 

Features of the voiceless bilabial nasal:

Occurrence

See also 
 Index of phonetics articles

Notes

References

External links
 

Bilabial consonants
Pulmonic consonants
Voiceless consonants
Nasal consonants